Niculae Conovici (born 13 March 1948, Bucharest - died 7 June 2005, Bucharest) was a Romanian archeologist, amphorologist and numismat. He has excavated in Satu Nou (Oltina), Constanța County.

Bibliography 
 Aspecte ale circulației drahmelor din Dyrrhachium și Apollonia în peninsula balcanică și în Dacia,  BNSR, 77–79, 1983–1985, p. 69-88
 Sapaturile arheologice în așezara getică fortificate de la Satu Nou, com. Oltina, jud. Constanța, campania 1989, Pontica, 23, 1990, p. 81-96, cu Mihai Irimia
 Histria VIII Les timbres amphoriques. 2. Sinope (Tuiles timbrées comprises), Bucarest, 1998

See also 
 List of Romanian archaeologists

Archaeologists from Bucharest
1948 births
2005 deaths
20th-century archaeologists